Jeryl Grant (born April 2, 1976) better known by his stage name Killa Sin is considered the best-known member of Killarmy and is regarded as one of the most skilled Wu-Tang Clan affiliates.

Biography 
Killa Sin has appeared on gold and platinum selling albums from members of the Wu-Tang Clan, on movie soundtracks such as Soul in the Hole and ONYX's Shut 'Em Down.

Killa Sin has been in-and-out of prison for the better part of his career and has been linked to several violent incidents within the hip-hop community including one in which rapper Mase left with a broken jaw and another where associates of 50 Cent were robbed. He is notorious in certain circles for having gone after figures of high prestige and celebrity. Killa Sin is the brother of Oli "Power" Grant, the Wu executive. He is currently mentoring his young nephew Young Prince. He was working on his own solo album. But in 2015, Killa Sin was convicted of criminal weapons possession and received a 16-years-to-life sentence. He is now currently in jail at the Sing Sing Correctional Facility in Ossining, N.Y.

Discography

Videography

References 

1976 births
Living people
Five percenters
Rappers from New York City
African-American male rappers
Wu-Tang Clan affiliates
East Coast hip hop musicians
Killarmy members
21st-century American rappers